Police Trainer 2 is a light gun arcade game and the sequel to Police Trainer. It was released by American companies Phantom Systems and Team Play Inc. in 2003 as both a stand-up cabinet and sit-down cabinet.

Gameplay 
Like its predecessor Police Trainer, players have three lives for the entire game. On simulation stages, players will have a health gauge. If the gauge is empty or if the player fails to reach a quota in a stage, one life is lost.

2003 video games
Arcade video games
Arcade-only video games
Light gun games
Video games about police officers
Video games developed in the United States